Giorgi Ghudushauri (born 18 February 1973 in Tbilisi) is a Georgian retired professional football and rugby player.

Ghudushauri appeared for the Georgia national team in a May 1996 friendly against Greece. In November 1996, he made a substitute's appearance in a 1998 FIFA World Cup qualifier against England.

References

1973 births
Living people
Footballers from Georgia (country)
Association football midfielders
Georgia (country) international footballers
Russian Premier League players
FSV Salmrohr players
FC Torpedo Moscow players
FC Torpedo-2 players
Expatriate footballers from Georgia (country)
Expatriate footballers in Russia
Expatriate footballers in Germany